Hemicoelus costatus is a species of beetles in the family Ptinidae, found primarily in Europe.

References

Ptinidae
Beetles described in 1830